The Selenomonadales are an order of bacteria within the class Negativicutes; unlike most other members of Bacillota, they are Gram-negative.  The phylogeny of this order was initially determined by 16S rRNA comparisons. More recently, molecular markers in the form of conserved signature indels (CSIs) have been found specific for all Selenomonadales species. On the basis of these markers, the Selenomonadales are inclusive of two distinct families, and are no longer the sole order within the Negativicutes. Several CSIs have also been found specific for both families, Sporomusaceae and Selenomonadceae. Samples of bacterial strains within this order have been isolated from the root canals of healthy human teeth.

Phylogeny
The currently accepted taxonomy is based on the List of Prokaryotic names with Standing in Nomenclature (LPSN) and National Center for Biotechnology Information (NCBI)

See also
 List of bacterial orders
 List of bacteria genera

References

External links
PATRIC
J.P. Euzéby: List of Prokaryotic names with Standing in Nomenclature - Order Selenomonadales
NCBI

Negativicutes
Gram-negative bacteria